The Sealed Angel (Zapechatlennyi angel) is a Russian-language composition by Rodion Shchedrin in the form of liturgical music based on the story "The Sealed Angel" by Nikolay Leskov. The plot concerns a rural community which protects a religious icon that has been confiscated by officials and sealed with wax. The work is written for soprano, mezzo or alto, tenor, choir boy soloists, flute or oboe, and choir.

The work has nine continuous movements. Performances typically last just under an hour.

Recordings 
State Academic Russian Choir & The Moscow Chamber Choir, Vladimir Minin; Melodiya
State Choir Latvija, Maris Sirmais; Wergo
Choir of Gonville & Caius College, Cambridge & The Choir of King's College London, Geoffrey Webber & David Trendell; Delphian
Soloists Berlin Radio Choir, Stefan Parkman; Coviello
Chicago Chorale, Bruce Tammen; Self-published

References

Compositions by Rodion Shchedrin
Choral compositions
Music based on short fiction